Clear may refer to:

Transparency and translucency, the physical property of allowing light to pass through

Arts and entertainment

Music

Groups
 Clear (Christian band), an American CCM group from Cambridge, Minnesota
 Clear (hardcore band), a vegan straight edge hardcore group from Utah

Albums
 Clear (Bomb the Bass album), 1995
 Clear (Cybotron album), originally and later titled Enter, or the title song (see below), 1983
 Clear (Spirit album) or the title song, 1969
 Clear (EP), by Periphery, 2014
 Clear, by James Ferraro, 2008
 Clear, an EP by Summer Walker, 2019

Songs
 "Clear" (Cybotron song), 1983
 "Clear" (Maaya Sakamoto song), 2018
 "Clear!", by Kardinal Offishall, 2009
 "Clear", by Miley Cyrus from Hannah Montana 2: Meet Miley Cyrus, 2007
 "Clear", by Needtobreathe from Hard Love, 2016
 "Clear", by P-Model from P-Model, 1992
 "Clear", by Twenty One Pilots, 2011

Other media
Clear (magazine), an American fashion and lifestyle magazine
Clear (visual novel), a 2007 adult Japanese visual novel and related media
"Clear" (The Walking Dead), a television episode
Clear, a 2001 ballet by Stanton Welch

Brands and enterprises
Clear (company), a UK-based carbon-offsetting company
Clear (shampoo), a brand of anti-dandruff shampoo from Unilever
CLEAR, a Registered Traveler program for expediting security checkpoints at airports and stadiums

Organizations
Clear (Scientology), a belief in Scientology
Campaign for Lead Free Air, a UK anti-pollution group
Cannabis Law Reform, a UK pro-cannabis legalisation group

People
Bob Clear (1927–2010), American baseball coach
Cameron Clear (born 1993), American football player
Eddie Clear (born 1944), American soccer player
Edwin A. Clear (1896–1960), English World War I flying ace
Marc Clear, British opera singer, musical performer, and director
Mark Clear (born 1956), American baseball pitcher
Todd Clear (born 1949), American criminologist

Technology
CLEAR (DOS command), an internal command in Seattle Computer's 86-DOS
clear (Unix), a UNIX command
Clear, any transmission or data which is not encoded

Other uses
Clear, Alaska, US
Clear Airport, a state-owned public-use airport
Clear Space Force Station, a radar station
The Clear or tetrahydrogestrinone, an anabolic steroid
CERN Linear Electron Accelerator for Research, a research and development facility

See also
 Claro (surname)
 Clear channel (disambiguation)
 Clearance (disambiguation)
 Cleare, a surname
 Clearing (disambiguation)
 Cleere, a surname
 Clere, a surname
 CLR (disambiguation)